The Open License Program is a Microsoft service that allows corporate, academic, charitable, or government organizations to obtain volume licenses for Microsoft products. It is ideally suited for companies with between 2 – 250 personal computers, but can accommodate organizations with up to 750 computers. Microsoft announced on 2 October, 2020 to end its 20-year-old Open License program for small and midsize organizations, starting on January 1, 2022.

Programs
Open License
Open License for Charities
Open License for Governments
Open License for Education
Open Value
Open Value Subscription

See also
Software license
Microsoft Enterprise Agreement

References

Software licenses